The End of the Myth: From the Frontier to the Border Wall in the Mind of America is a book written by Greg Grandin, which won 2020's Pulitzer Prize for General Nonfiction, on the role of the frontier from the American Revolution to the presidential election of 2016.

Reception 
The End of the Myth won a 2020 Pulitzer Prize for General Nonfiction, along with Anne Boyer's The Undying: Pain, Vulnerability, Mortality, Medicine, Art, Time, Dreams, Data, Exhaustion, Cancer, and Care.

Ben Ehrenreich described the work as "a powerful and painful book, clear-sighted, meticulous and damning". Benjamin H. Johnson described the book as "arresting and original". he The End of the Myth: From the Frontier to the Border Wall in the Mind of America Introduction

In his 2019 book The End of the Myth: From the Frontier to the Border Wall in the Mind of America, Greg Grandin offers an incisive critique of the long-standing notion of American exceptionalism. Grandin’s work is part of a larger effort to challenge the tradition

References

Further reading 

 
 

History books about the United States
Pulitzer Prize for General Non-Fiction-winning works
2019 non-fiction books
Henry Holt and Company books